East Timor uses UTC+09:00. In the west the country borders the UTC+08:00 zone of Central Indonesia and in the east the UTC+09:00 zone of that country. Daylight saving time is never observed in East Timor, due to its proximity to the equator; there is only a small variation between the length of day and night throughout the year. East Timor shares the same time zone with Japan, Palau, North Korea, South Korea, and Eastern Indonesia.

IANA time zone database
The IANA time zone database contains one zone for East Timor in the file zone.tab, which is named Asia/Dili.